Reinholds is an unincorporated community and census-designated place (CDP) in West Cocalico Township, Lancaster County, Pennsylvania, United States. As of the 2010 census the population was 1,803.

The Reinholds Station Trinity Chapel was listed on the National Register of Historic Places in 1990.

Geography
Reinholds is the northernmost census-designated place in Lancaster County. It is in eastern West Cocalico Township, with its eastern edge following the border with East Cocalico Township. Pennsylvania Route 897 is Reinholds' Main Street, leading northwest  to Lebanon and southeast  to East Earl.

Little Cocalico Creek passes through the community, flowing south to join Cocalico Creek in Denver. It is part of the Conestoga River watershed, flowing to the Susquehanna River.

Demographics
U.S. Census data is available for both the Reinholds census-designated place (CDP) and the larger area covered by the Reinholds ZIP code, 17569.

The Reinholds CDP has a 2017 estimated population of 1,849 with a median age of 37.7 and a median household income of $77,107 for 629 housing units. Individuals below the poverty level include 15.3% of the population; 91.1% of the population had attained a high school diploma or a higher level of education. The population includes 1,743 "white" individuals (94.3%) and 106 "American Indian and Alaska Native" individuals (5.7%).

The 17569 ZIP code covers  including Reinholds plus the areas of Blainsport, Swartzville, and Vera Cruz in Lancaster County, as well as Vinemont in Berks County. The ZIP code had a 2017 estimated population of 5,837 with a median age of 36.2 and a median household income of $79,375 for 1,981 housing units. Individuals below the poverty level include 5.2% of the population; 83.5% of the population had attained a high school diploma or a higher level of education. The population includes 5,559 "white" individuals (95.2%), 136 "Asian" (2.3%), 106 "American Indian and Alaska Native"(1.8%), 36 of two or more races (0.6%), and 124 Hispanic or Latino (of any race) (2.1%).

References

Census-designated places in Lancaster County, Pennsylvania
Census-designated places in Pennsylvania
Unincorporated communities in Lancaster County, Pennsylvania
Unincorporated communities in Pennsylvania